Horseshoe Lake is a lake located in the eastern part of Lassen Volcanic National Park near Juniper Lake, in Shasta County, California. Water from Horseshoe Lake drains to Snag Lake via Grassy Creek. The lake is accessible by hiking trail only.

See also
List of lakes in California

References

Lakes of Lassen Volcanic National Park
Lakes of Shasta County, California
Lakes of California
Lakes of Northern California